The New Democratic Left was a political party in Chile. It was founded in 1963 by former members of the National Democratic Party (PDN), who had left PDN in protest of the party joining the Popular Action Front (FRAP). FRAP supported Salvador Allende in the 1964 presidential election, whereas NID supported Eduardo Frei. NID was later dissolved, and most of its members joined the Agrarian Labor Democracy.

References

Defunct political parties in Chile
1963 establishments in Chile
1963 disestablishments in Chile
Political parties established in 1963
Political parties disestablished in 1963